Hunt Club is a community in River Ward, in the south end of Ottawa, Ontario, Canada. The area is named after the Ottawa Hunt and Golf Club, which was first developed in  1876. Hunt Club Road and many local businesses were also named after the golf course.

Hunt Club is located just north of the Ottawa Macdonald–Cartier International Airport and to the east of the Rideau River. The Hunt Club Community Organization defines the boundaries as the Rideau River to the west, the Airport Parkway to the east, the CN Albion line and Via Rail Beachburg Subdivision to the north and Hunt Club Road to the south. The population of the area is 12,264 as of the 2016 Canadian census.

16% of the area is publicly-accessible green space. It has three times the green space as the Ottawa average, including the Sawmill Creek wetlands and Rideau River shoreline. Hunt Club has seven city parks: Cahill, McCarthy, Owl, Paul Landry, Riverwood, Uplands, and Uplands Riverside.

Hunt Club has a mixed demographic in age groups, ethnocultural backgrounds, socio-economic levels and family set ups. The area also has the second largest Asian Canadian population in Ottawa. Housing in the area includes single dwellings, semi-detached and townhouse units, apartment buildings, retirement homes, and housing projects.

Hunt Club was originally settled by Europeans in the early nineteenth century and it was originally part of Gloucester Township. In 1950, the still largely rural area was annexed into the city of Ottawa. Development of the area began in the 1970s, and many houses and buildings in the area are from this period. It was designed as a bedroom community with little commercial area.

Sub neighbourhoods
(from west to east)
Quinterra
Hunt Club Woods
Hunt Club Estate
Western Community

See also
List of Ottawa neighbourhoods

References

Neighbourhoods in Ottawa